Great Lakes Brewery is a craft beer brewery in Toronto, Ontario, Canada.

Great Lakes Brewery was started in 1987 in an industrial unit in Brampton by Bruce Cornish and four other silent partners. The group produced two beers, an ale and a lager, using malt extract. The beer was packaged in 1 litre plastic home brew bottles with a focus on the home retailer. After four years of production, Cornish and the silent partners had run out of capital to keep the brewery functioning. Peter Bulut Sr., a construction magnate in Etobicoke, had been introduced to Cornish through respective business deals and plans were underway to sell the brewery to him. Bulut Sr. purchased the business in 1990, made the change from malt extract brewing to all grain, and in the early months of 1991, moved the brewery to Toronto.

In 2009, with the health of Peter Bulut Sr. in decline, his children, Peter Bulut Jr. and his sister Anetta Jewell, took on more responsibility of the day-to-day operations. They, along with the brewing team, introduced new brands and marketing initiatives that led to increased sales through the LCBO, bars and restaurants. The brewing team experimented with flavours, gave their beers weird and wacky names, and showcased their creations with monthly Project X nights (no longer taking place). Bulut Sr. died in 2010, leaving the brewery to his family. Bulut Jr. took over the brewery, operating as President and Chief Brewing Officer.

Timeline

List of beers

Awards

See also 
 Beer in Canada
 Barrel-aged beer

References 

Food and drink companies based in Toronto
Manufacturing companies based in Toronto
Beer brewing companies based in Ontario
Privately held companies of Canada